Vries may refer to:

 Vries (surname), list of people with the surname Vries
 Vries, Netherlands, a village in the Dutch province of Drenthe

See also
 De Vries